"Hurrah! Hurrah for the Christmas Ship" was a World War I era song that encouraged kids to donate money, food, and clothing for European children affected by the war. It was written and composed by Henry S. Sawyer and produced by McKinley Music Co. in 1914.

Soon after war broke out in Europe, the editor of the Chicago Herald, James Keeley, published an appeal to American children to donate gifts to Europe's soon to be war orphans. Two hundred newspapers across the country reprinted the appeal and together, the press coordinated a humanitarian aid campaign. 

Collection efforts went on for months amassing upwards of 5,000,000 items of clothing, food, and gifts. Donations were sorted, repacked, and marked for Belgium, Germany, France, Austria, Hungary, Serbia, Greece, and Russia. The Red Cross was in charge of distributing the goods.

US Army soldiers  at Fort Hamilton loaded the cargo onto the US Navy's collier, the Jason, which it loaned to transport the goods. The Jason was known as both the Christmas Ship and the Santa Claus Ship.

Lyrics 
Come, boys and girls, just listen to 
This news for you and me:
They're going to send a Christmas Ship
Across the great blue sea!
It's going to be filled with gifts 
For families abroad
Who've suffered in this cruel war
From fire, gun, and sword
Now all the boys and all the girls
Will ev'ry effort bend
To see how many useful things
They to the ship can send;
But I was thinking we could do
About as much real good 
By sending money from our banks
As well as clothes and food

CHORUS

Hurrah! Hurrah for the Christmas Ship
As it starts across the sea
With its load of gifts and its greater load 
Of loving sympathy.
Let's wave our hats and clap our hands
As we send it on its trip;
May many a heart and home be cheered 
By the gifts of the Christmas Ship!

The paper say there's thousands who
Are homeless thro' the war;
That Santa Claus can't half get 'round
As he has done before.
So this year we'll help Santa Claus
Remember each poor child,
And bring a smile of happiness
Amid those terrors wild.
Let Dorothy and Mary send
A pair of shoes apiece,
And little Jane can send the dime 
She got from Aunt Bernice,
While Tom and all the boys and girls
Are eager to pitch in
To make this Christmas time the best
The world has ever seen.

REPEAT CHORUS

See also
 Downloadable PDF of original sheet music from York University's Scott Library Special Collections - Sheet Music Collection. Hurrah! Hurrah for the Christmas Ship!

References

Songs of World War I
1914 songs
Songs about children
Songs about boats
American Christmas songs